Rodrigo Amado (born 18 May 1976) is a Brazilian sailor. He competed in the men's 470 event at the 1996 Summer Olympics.

References

External links
 

1976 births
Living people
Brazilian male sailors (sport)
Olympic sailors of Brazil
Sailors at the 1996 Summer Olympics – 470
Sportspeople from Rio de Janeiro (city)
St. Mary's Seahawks sailors